Leatham is a surname and given name. Notable people with the name include:

Surname:
Albert Leatham (1859–1948), English cricketer
Bob Leatham (born 1925), Canadian football player
Edward Aldam Leatham (1828–1900), English Liberal Member of Parliament
George Leatham (1849–1916), Australian politician
Gerald Leatham (1851–1932), English amateur first-class cricketer
John Leatham (born 1946), former Australian rules footballer
Lady Victoria Leatham (born 1947), antiques expert and television personality
Ralph Leatham KCB (1888–1954), Royal Navy officer, Commander-in-Chief, Plymouth during World War II
Rob Leatham (born 1961), also known as "TGO", professional shooter
William Henry Leatham (1815–1889), British banker, poet and Liberal politician
William Leatham (banker) (1785–1842), leading Banker in Wakefield, a Quaker and an abolitionist

Given name:
William Leatham Bright (1851–1910), English Liberal politician
Robert Leatham Simpson (1915–2003), general authority of The LDS Church from 1961 until his death

See also
Kirk Leatham, a village in North Yorkshire, England
Leatham River, river of the Marlborough Region of New Zealand's South Island
Leatham D. Smith Shipbuilding Company, a shipyard and dry dock company in Sturgeon Bay, Door County, Wisconsin
Latham (disambiguation)
Leath
Letham (disambiguation)
Upleatham